Pathi Bakthi is a 1958 Indian Tamil-language drama film starring Sivaji Ganesan, Gemini Ganesan, Savitri and M. N. Rajam. It was released on 14 March 1958.

Plot

Cast 
Cast adapted from the film's song book and the opening credits of the film:

Male cast
 Sivaji Ganesan as Pandiyan
 Gemini Ganesan as Moorthy
 V. Nagayya  as Butha Bhikshu
 T. S. Balaiah  as Sanyasi
 K. A. Thangavelu as Parameswaran Pillai
 Chandrababu as Kalaipithan
 M. R. Santhanam as Nallasivam Pillai
 Krishnan as Thirupathy
 Rama Rao as Iyer
 Karikol Raju as Home Owner
 Balakrishnan

Female cast
 Savithri as Alli, Bhagyam
 M. N. Rajam as Marikozhunthu
 Vijayakumari as Nalini
 C. K. Saraswathi as Meenakshi
 M. S. Saroja as Mohana
 K. Malathi  as Dancer
 Angamuthu, Uma, Patti
Radhabhai

Soundtrack 
The music was composed by Viswanathan–Ramamoorthy, while the lyrics were penned by Pattukkottai Kalyanasundaram.

Pathi Bakthi (Telugu) Songs

The music was composed by T. Chalapathi Rao. Lyrics were by Sri Sri.

References

External links 
 

1958 films
1950s Tamil-language films
Films directed by A. Bhimsingh
Films scored by Viswanathan–Ramamoorthy